The Ballynahatty Woman is the name given to a prehistoric female human found in the townland of Ballynahatty near Belfast in 1855. She is estimated to have lived about 5,000 years ago. In 2015, her genome, along with that of a trio of men who lived 4,000 years ago, was sequenced by geneticists at Trinity College Dublin and archaeologists at Queen's University Belfast.

Both Ballynahatty Woman and one of the men were found to have mutations that can cause hemochromatosis, a disease where the body retains too much iron and has a high prevalence in the British Isles. She was found to have Neolithic Anatolian ancestry, and out of modern peoples most genetically resembles the inhabitants of Spain and Sardinia

See also

Laurence Waddell

References

History of Belfast
Archaeology of death
Human remains (archaeological)
Stone Age Britain
1855 archaeological discoveries